Znamya Truda is a Russian football club from Orekhovo-Zuevo, Moscow Oblast. The club is most noted because they are the oldest now-playing club in Russia, founded in 1909. They currently play in the FNL 2. The club's finest hour came in 1962 when they reached the final of the USSR Cup.

History

The club was founded in the village of Orekhovo which was to join with Zuevo and Nikolskoye to form Orekhovo-Zuyevo in 1917.

In the 2017–18 season, Znamya Truda finished last in its group, losing 24 matches out of 26. It had to lose its professional status and be relegated to the Amateur Football League, however, the club avoided relegation since another club in the competition ceased to exist.

Naming History
1909–1935: Morozovtsy, KSO, TsPKFK, Orekhovo-Zuyevo, Krasnoye Orekhovo, Krasny Tekstilshchik
1935–1937: Krasnoye Znamya
1938–1945: Zvezda
1946–1957: Krasnoye Znamya
1958–1991: Znamya Truda
1992: Khitryye Lisy
1993–1994: FC Orekhovo
1995–1996: GFC Orekhovo
1997–2002: Spartak-Orekhovo
2003–present: Znamya Truda

Current squad
As of 22 February 2023, according to the Second League website.

Notable players
Had international caps for their respective countries. Players whose name is listed in bold represented their countries while playing for Znamya Truda.

Russia/USSR
 Mikhail Biryukov
 Vyacheslav Dayev
 Sergei Ignashevich
 Viktor Papayev
 Aleksandr Sheshukov

Former USSR countries
 Igor Vityutnev
 Akhmed Yengurazov
 Andrei Martynov

References

External links
Official website
Official VK

 
Association football clubs established in 1909
Football clubs in Russia
Football in Moscow Oblast
1909 establishments in the Russian Empire